Bergh Apton Anglo-Saxon cemetery is a late-5th to late-6th century Anglo-Saxon burial site discovered at Bergh Apton, Norfolk. The site was excavated in 1973 and 63 graves were found. The south and west portions of the site had previously been destroyed. The state of preservation of the skeletal remains was described as "very poor" due to the acidity of the soil and the sex of individuals was determined by grave goods. Grave goods found at the site included weapons, shields, spears and jewellery. One grave, possibly of a minstrel-poet, was found to contain a lyre similar to that found at Sutton Hoo. Twelve of the graves were those of children aged under 12 years. No evidence for an Anglo-Saxon settlement adjacent to the cemetery has been found.

The artefacts are currently held by Norwich Castle Museum.

See also
 Burial in Early Anglo-Saxon England
 List of Anglo-Saxon cemeteries

References

Anglo-Saxon burial practices
Anglo-Saxon sites in England
Archaeology of death
Archaeology of the kingdom of East Anglia
Archaeological sites in Norfolk
History of Norfolk